Crofton is a civil parish in the metropolitan borough of the City of Wakefield, West Yorkshire, England.  The parish contains ten listed buildings that are recorded in the National Heritage List for England.  Of these, one is listed at Grade II*, the middle of the three grades, and the others are at Grade II, the lowest grade.  The parish contains the village of Crofton and the surrounding countryside.  The listed buildings include a church and structures in the churchyard, including a mausoleum, houses and cottages, a public house, a farmhouse and farm buildings, and a set of stocks.


Key

Buildings

References

Citations

Sources

 

Lists of listed buildings in West Yorkshire